The Four Seasons Hotel New York Downtown, also known as 30 Park Place, is a hotel and residential skyscraper in Tribeca, Manhattan, New York City. At , the tower is one of the tallest residential buildings in Lower Manhattan.  The top floors of the 82-story building, known as the Four Seasons Private Residences New York Downtown, have 157 residences, ranging from one to six bedrooms, all reached through a dedicated residential lobby at 30 Park Place. Below is a 189-room Four Seasons Hotel, with its own lobby on Barclay Street, which opened in September 2016.

History

Larry Silverstein's Silverstein Properties, developer of the nearby World Trade Center, purchased the property at 99 Church Street for $170 million from Moody's Corporation in November 2006. At the time, the site was occupied by an 11-story,  office building built in 1951 that served as Moody's headquarters. However, Moody's had recently agreed to move to Silverstein's 7 World Trade Center which would leave the Church Street building vacant in 2007. At the time, the developer and CalSTRS planned to tear down the offices and replace it with a 58-story residential tower.

In March 2007, Silverstein officially unveiled plans for a 60-story, mixed-use tower on the site that would include a boutique hotel on the building's first 20 stories. The 2011 Driehaus Prize winner Robert A. M. Stern was revealed as the architect in November 2007 when Silverstein announced that the building would begin construction in mid 2008 for an early 2011 completion. Demolition of the previous 11-story building began in November 2007. However, by March 2009 the project was on hold as Silverstein was unable to acquire financing during the Financial crisis of 2007–2008.

Larry Silverstein announced a new start date of 2012 and a completion date of 2014 at the Bloomberg Real Estate Briefing in November 2010. In May 2013, Silverstein Properties secured $660 million for construction financing from UK hedge fund The Children's Investment Fund. Tishman Construction managed the project. Construction began in the fall of 2013, the building topped out in early 2015, and installation of the exterior and windows was finished in August 2015. The hotel celebrated its grand opening on September 19, 2016. At the time it was the second tallest residential building in Downtown Manhattan, after 70 Pine Street.

Amenities
Four Seasons Hotel New York Downtown features 189 guest rooms and suites, a 75-foot lap pool, a spa with seven treatment rooms, 24-hour business services, and a 24-hour gym. 
Just off the lobby is CUT by Wolfgang Puck, the celebrity chef's first New York City restaurant.

See also 
 List of tallest buildings in New York City
 Silverstein Properties

References

External links
 
  30 Park Place - Four Seasons Private Residences New York Downtown
 Four Seasons Hotel New York Downtown
 Silverstein Properties

2016 establishments in New York City
Condo hotels in the United States
Four Seasons hotels and resorts
Financial District, Manhattan
Hotel buildings completed in 2016
New Classical architecture
Residential buildings completed in 2016
Residential condominiums in New York City
Residential skyscrapers in Manhattan
Robert A. M. Stern buildings
Skyscraper hotels in Manhattan
Tribeca
Pencil towers in New York City